WHTA (107.9 FM) is a commercial radio station licensed to Hampton, Georgia, and serving the Atlanta metropolitan area.  It is owned by Urban One and it airs an urban contemporary radio format, focused on hip hop and R&B music.  The studios and offices are located inside the Centennial Tower building in downtown Atlanta.

The transmitter is off Swanson Road in Tyrone, Georgia, about 30 miles south southwest of Atlanta.  At an effective radiated power (ERP) of 35,000 watts, the signal covers the city and its southern suburbs, and may not be easily received north of Atlanta.  WHTA broadcasts in IBOC digital radio, using the HD Radio system from iBiquity.

Programming
The weekday on-air lineup consists of the syndicated "Rickey Smiley Morning Show", which is based at WHTA.  It is followed by Reec in middays, Mz. Shyneka in afternoons, the Durtty Boyz Show with Stuey Rock and DJ Kash each evening and Erin Rae overnight.  The station launched several careers, including rapper and actor Ludacris, when he was known as on-air personality "Chris Lova Lova," as well as MTV VJs La La Anthony and K.K. Holiday.

History

WCRY-FM Macon
The station began as WCRY-FM in Macon, Georgia, about 85 miles south of Atlanta.  It signed on the air on October 19, 1973, and was owned by Central Georgia Broadcasting.  At first, it mostly simulcast its AM counterpart, WCRY at 900 kHz (now WYPZ).  By the late 1970s, WCRY-FM was airing a beautiful music format.  In 1981, it switched its call sign to WPEZ, playing easy listening music, powered at 100,000 watts.  It later shifted to soft adult contemporary music as "Lite Rock" WPEZ. The station was later known as Z108 in the mid-1980s, which is one out of 2 stations using the "Z" name in the Macon market, with the other being WQBZ.

The station was acquired in 1996 by U.S. Broadcasting, which had plans to move it into the more lucrative Atlanta radio market.  To gain Federal Communications Commission (FCC) approval, a few stations in Middle Georgia were relocated: WPEZ's Soft AC format was switched from 107.9 to an existing frequency at 93.7 in Jeffersonville, while the original Top 40 format on 93.7 was shifted to a new Macon-area station as WMGB at 95.1 MHz.  U.S. Broadcasting petitioned the FCC to reallocate the broadcast license for 107.9 from Macon to Hampton.

With the FCC giving its OK, Radio One, a large minority-owned broadcasting company, paid $60 million for the new "move in" Atlanta-area station at 107.9.  Radio One already owned a station in the Atlanta market, 97.5 WHTA, in Fayetteville, airing an Urban Contemporary format.  WHTA had signed on as an urban station on July 17, 1995; Radio One had plans to put WHTA's call letters and format on its new acquisition.

WHTA Hot 107.9
At first, Radio One didn't want its competitors in Atlanta to figure out its game plan, so in September 2001, the new Atlanta-area 107.9 transmitter signed on as WEGF "107.9 the End" with a modern rock format. Stunting on its first day, it played "Smooth Criminal" by Alien Ant Farm and "Rollin'" by Limp Bizkit continuously.

After several weeks with the rock format on 107.9 FM, "Hot 97.5" morning host Ryan Cameron made an announcement that "Hot" was moving to 107.9, revealing that the rock format was a publicity stunt.  WHTA officially switched frequencies on November 1, 2001.  107.9 became "Hot 107.9" WHTA, while 97.5 became WPZE, playing urban gospel music.  (WPZE later moved to 102.5 MHz in Mableton.)

WHTA's move to 107.9 gave it a stronger signal over Intown Atlanta and surrounding suburbs, despite being considered a "move-in" station.

Residents in Tyrone, Georgia have complained to the FCC that WHTA's transmitter interferes with their electrical items, from phones to computer speakers.  WHTA got a construction permit from the FCC to increase the height of the antenna on the tower, but this only reduced the problem rather than eliminating it.

Digital Hip Hop
On July 31, 2007, WHTA began using a new slogan, "Hot 107.9, Your Digital Hip Hop Station."

In October 2008, WHTA became the Atlanta network affiliate of the Rickey Smiley Morning Show.  It was originally based at co-owned KBFB in the Dallas/Fort Worth Metroplex.  In 2011, WHTA became the flagship station for the show.

In 2011, Radio One changed several of its Atlanta-area stations' formats and call signs; WAMJ moved from 102.5 to 107.5, and began simulcasting its Urban AC format on 97.5 as WUMJ, while WPZE's urban gospel format moved from 97.5 to 102.5.  That left WHTA as the only station in Radio One's Atlanta cluster that was unaffected by the change.

Radio One was renamed Urban One on May 8, 2018.

References

External links
Hot 107.9 official website

Urban One stations
HTA
Radio stations established in 1980
Urban contemporary radio stations in the United States